was a Japanese photographer. 

As an officer of the Metropolitan Police Department, he was virtually the only person who pictured the immediate damages by the bombings of Tokyo in World War II under a strict regulation that prohibited civilians from taking pictures of war damages.

Gallery

References

Japanese photographers
1904 births
1989 deaths
Artists from Fukui Prefecture